Alen is an Armenian and Yugoslav given name and may refer to:

 Alen Avdić (born 1977), Bosnian football player
 Alen Bajkusa (born 1971), soccer player
 Alen Bokšić (born 1970), former football striker
 Alen Floričić (born 1968), modern Croatian artist
 Alen Halilović (born 1996), Croatian football player
 Alen Islamović (born 1957), Bosniak singer
 Alen Lončar (born 1974), Croatian freestyle swimmer
 Alen Marcina (born 1979), Canadian footballer
 Alen Mujanovič (born 1976), Slovenian footballer
 Alen Muratović (born 1979), Montenegrin handball player
 Alen Orman (born 1978), Bosnian-Austrian footballer
 Alen Peternac (born 1972), Croatian football striker
 Alen Pol Kobryn (born 1949), American poet and novelist
 Alen Simonyan (born 1980), Armenian politician
 Alen Škoro (born 1981), Bosnian footballer
 Alen Stevanović (born 1991) Serbian footballer
 Alen Stajcic (born 1973), former semi-professional football player
 Alen Smailagić (born 2000), Serbian basketball player

See also
 Alen (disambiguation)
 Alén (name), a given name and surname
 Alen Baronets
 Van Alen (disambiguation)
 Alan (given name)
 Allan (name)
 Allen (given name)

Masculine given names
Bosniak masculine given names
Bosnian masculine given names
Croatian masculine given names